Oberwiera is a municipality in the district of Zwickau in Saxony in Germany. Oberwiera has the following districts: Harthau, Neukirchen, Niederwiera, Oberwiera, Röhrsdorf and Wickersdorf. Around half of the population lives in the main district of Oberwiera.

Municipalities around Oberwiere are Remse, Schönberg and the city of Waldenburg as well as Nobitz and Ziegelheim in Thuringia.

History 
Oberwiera was mentioned the first time in 1254 A.D. Therefore Oberwiera is as old as its neighbor city Waldenburg.

References

Zwickau (district)